Malaysian Airline System Flight 684 was a scheduled international passenger flight of Malaysian Airline System (now Malaysia Airlines) from Singapore Changi Airport in Singapore to Subang International Airport, in Subang (near Kuala Lumpur), Malaysia. On 18 December 1983, the Airbus A300B4-120 operating the flight crashed  short of the runway while landing at Subang International Airport. There were no fatalities among the 247 passengers and crew.

Accident 
Malaysian Airline System Flight 684 departed Singapore Changi Airport on 18 December 1983 at 18:53 local time. As the flight approached Subang International Airport (now Sultan Abdul Aziz Shah Airport) in Subang, Selangor, Malaysia at 19:20 local time, it was cleared for an instrument landing despite poor runway visibility of  due to rain. Airline policy required visibility of at least , but the pilot assumed control from the first officer and began his descent. Furthermore, the air crew did not turn on the Instrument Landing System on the aircraft due to increased workload which was exacerbated further due to the different cockpit switch configuration between the A300 owned by Malaysian Airline System and that of the crashed aircraft, which was on lease from Scandinavian Airlines System.

The altimeter warning sounded and within 30 seconds the aircraft struck trees  short of the runway. The aircraft was still  short of the runway and had lost its landing gear and both of its Pratt & Whitney JT9D-59A turbofan engines. All 247 passengers and crew managed to evacuate before the fire destroyed the aircraft. The accident was the second hull loss of an Airbus A300.

Probable cause
The probable cause was ascribed to pilot error in not monitoring descent rate during approach in instrument meteorological conditions (IMC) and continuing an approach below company minima without sighting the runway.

References

External links
 Accident description at the Aviation Safety Network

Malaysian Airline System 684
Airliner accidents and incidents involving controlled flight into terrain
1983 in Malaysia
Aviation accidents and incidents in 1983
Aviation accidents and incidents in Malaysia
684
1980s in Kuala Lumpur
December 1983 events in Asia
Airliner accidents and incidents caused by weather
Airliner accidents and incidents caused by pilot error